The Australian two-cent coin was introduced in 1966 and was the coin of the second-lowest denomination until it was withdrawn from circulation in 1992 (along with the one-cent piece). It is still counted as legal tender, but is subject to some restrictions, and one-cent and two-cent coins are legal tender only up to the sum of 20 cents.

History
The coin entered circulation on 14 February 1966. In its first year of minting the coin was manufactured at three different mints: 145.2 million at the Royal Australian Mint in Canberra, 66.6 million at the Melbourne Mint and 217.7 million at the Perth Mint. The only year that the coins were minted outside Australia was 1981, when 70.8 million were struck at the British Royal Mint in Llantrisant, Wales, in addition to 97.4 million from Canberra and 81.8 million from Perth. No two cent coins were struck in 1986 or 1987 and the last year of minting was 1989.

From 1966 until 1984 the obverse featured the portrait of Queen Elizabeth II by Arnold Machin. It was changed in 1985 to a version by Raphael Maklouf, which remained until its withdrawal from circulation in 1992.

The 2c was only minted for coin sets in the following years: 1986, 1987, 1990, 1991, and finally, 2006.

The decision to remove it was confirmed in the Treasurer's budget speech of 21 August 1990. The removed was due to inflation reducing its value, and the high cost of bronze. Around the same time other countries removed their bronze coins—New Zealand removed its one and two cent coins in 1990, while the United Kingdom and Ireland replaced their bronze one and two pence coins with copper-plated steel coins. After removal from circulation, some of the coins were melted down to make bronze medals for the 2000 Summer Olympics in Sydney, Australia.

Features
The reverse side of the coin features the image of a Frill-necked lizard (Chlamydosaurus kingii), a reptile native to northern Australia and southern New Guinea. The image was designed by Stuart Devlin, who designed the reverses of all Australian decimal coins introduced in 1966.

References

Sources

 
 Prospect Stamps and Coins

Decimal coins of Australia
Two-cent coins